Vitex cofassus is a species of woody plant in the family Lamiaceae. Native to New Guinea and the Southwest Pacific islands, "New Guinea teak" is planted for its hardwood, used in construction, in Indonesia, Malaysia, and the Philippines.

It yields one of two woods from the same genus that are each called Molave Wood, the other being the timber of Vitex parviflora.

References

cofassus
Trees of the Philippines
Taxa named by Caspar Georg Carl Reinwardt